Where Is Parsifal? is a 1984 British comedy film directed by Henri Helman and starring Tony Curtis, Cassandra Domenica, Erik Estrada, Peter Lawford (in his final film role), Ron Moody, Donald Pleasence and Orson Welles.

The film screened in the Un Certain Regard section at the 1984 Cannes Film Festival, before being released in the United Kingdom on 19 July 1985 by J. Arthur Rank Film Distributors (The Rank Organisation).

Plot
Parsifal Katzenellenbogen (Tony Curtis) is an eccentric hypochondriac who has invented a laser skywriter.  Parsifal invites businessmen to his castle in the hopes of selling his invention.  Potential buyers include gangster Henry Board II (Erik Estrada) accompanied by has-been movie star Montague Chippendale (Peter Lawford), Scotsman Mackintosh (Donald Pleasence), and gypsy Klingsor (Orson Welles).

Cast
Tony Curtis – Parsifal Katzenellenbogen
Berta Domínguez – D.Elba (as Cassandra Domenica)
Erik Estrada – Henry Board II
Peter Lawford – Montague Chippendale
Ron Moody – Beersbohm
Donald Pleasence – Mackintosh
Orson Welles – Klingsor
Christopher Chaplin – Ivan
Nancy Roberts – Ruth
Ava Lazar – Sheila

Release

Where Is Parsifal? is often incorrectly considered to be a lost film, since it has never been commercially available in the UK or US—in fact, it is on the British Film Institute's 75 Most Wanted list of lost films, though its status was updated to "found" after director Helman donated his personal print to the BFI—but the film was released on home video in (at least) Italy, The Netherlands and in Australia (by Seven Keys Video) during the 1980s. The misinformation about the film being lost is due to the fact that although it was screened at the 1984 Cannes Film Festival, it was withdrawn prior to its official release date in the UK. In May 2013, the film appeared on Netflix streaming.

References

External links
 BFI 75 Most Wanted entry, with extensive notes
 

1983 films
1983 comedy films
British comedy films
1980s English-language films
1980s British films